Lord Nelson (1758–1805) was a British admiral.

Lord Nelson may also refer to:

Boats
Lord Nelson 41, an American sailboat design

Places
Lord Nelson Elementary School, Vancouver, British Columbia, Canada
Lord Nelson Hotel, Halifax, Nova Scotia, Canada
Lord Nelson Ground, a now defunct stadia that was occupied by Millwall Rovers F.C. from 1886 to 1890.

Ships
 List of ships named Lord Nelson

Other uses
Lord Nelson mass, Missa in Angustiis written by Joseph Haydn
SR Lord Nelson class steam locomotive
Lord Nelson (rapper), lead vocalist for the rap metal band Stuck Mojo
Lord Nelson Roney (1853–1944), carpenter and contractor in Eugene, Oregon
Ernest Rutherford, Lord Rutherford of Nelson (1871–1937), New Zealand physicist
Baron Nelson of Stafford, a title in the peerage

See also
Admiral Lord Nelson School, Portsmouth, Hampshire, England
Horatio Nelson (disambiguation)
Earl Nelson